Pelomonas is a genus of Gram-negative, rod-shaped, non-spore-forming bacteria from the family  Comamonadaceae, which were isolated from haemodialysis water.

References

Comamonadaceae
Bacteria genera